Malév Hungarian Airlines Flight 262 was a flight from Budapest Ferihegy International Airport to Thessaloniki International Airport. On 4 July 2000, a Tupolev Tu-154, belonging to Malév Hungarian Airlines, used on this flight performed a gear-up touchdown during the landing at Thessaloniki, skidded on the runway, but was able to take off and land normally after a go-around. No injuries were reported.

Before the incident
The aircraft normally used on this service was a Boeing 737-300. However, on the day of the incident, the intended aircraft (registration HA-LES) had an engine problem and was replaced with a Tupolev Tu-154, registration HA-LCR, at the last minute.

After a short flight from Budapest, the Tupolev started descent to its destination in very good weather conditions. The ground proximity warning system (GPWS), detecting such a low height, constantly warned the crew to lower the undercarriage. Disturbed by the ever sounding horn, the flight crew switched the system off.

The airplane was approaching Thessaloniki without apparent problems but faster than usual. Due to that, it turned on to its final approach sooner than expected. At that time, the destination runway 28 was occupied by a Boeing 757, cleared to take-off. The Tupolev's pilot in command decided not to lower the landing gear and to perform a go-around.

Nevertheless, as the 757 started take-off, the captain decided to land. Due to extreme time constraints, the crew didn't have enough time to read the before-landing checklist. With deactivated GPWS, only the Tower ATC could warn the crew that the landing gear was up. However, since the Tupolev already had landing clearance, the tower controllers were busy departing the 757.

First landing attempt
As the Tupolev came closer, Captain Peter "Trenky" Trenkner, sitting in his aircraft on the apron, noticed that the landing Tupolev didn't have its landing gear extended. He shouted into the radio several times: "Go around, Malev, go around!" (audible on the CVR recording).

The Malév 262 captain realized the problem and immediately ordered a go-around. As the engines spun up, the Tu-154 lifted off the ground, became airborne again and climbed out.

The airport was closed and the aircraft made a low approach above the control tower with lowered gear before attempting the landing again. After the initial touchdown and lift-off, the Tupolev was airborne for a further 16 minutes and 20 seconds.

Second landing attempt

The pilots landed the aircraft very smoothly, but were afraid that the landing gear would collapse and the plane would spin around and explode. The Tupolev was fueled for the return flight to Budapest as well, therefore there were more than 30 tons of jet fuel on board. However, the landing roll went safely. The characteristic Tupolev's large landing gear pods, in which the wheels are retracted during flight, were used as sledges and shielded the landing gear, wing and flaps.

At the time of the incident Malév, the Hungarian national airline, was phasing out their old Tupolevs. Malév inspected the hidden damages of the involved aircraft and realised that it would be uneconomical to repair it, and donated the wreck to the fire department of the airport. For several years, the fire fighters of Thessaloniki airport were trained on the former HA-LCR. The plane was scrapped by the end of 2018.

References

External links

 Air Accident Investigation and Aviation Safety Board: Final report (Archive) 
 airliners.net pictures of TU-154 HA-LCR.
 cockpit voice recorder of the Tupolev Tu-154 HA-LCR of Malév flight 262.

Aviation accidents and incidents in 2000
Aviation accidents and incidents in Greece
2000 in Greece
Airliner accidents and incidents involving belly landings
Malév Hungarian Airlines accidents and incidents
Accidents and incidents involving the Tupolev Tu-154
July 2000 events in Europe